Preventive and social medicine is a branch of medicine dealing with providing health services in areas of prevention, promotion and treatment of rehabilitative diseases. Studies in preventive and social medicine are helpful in providing guided care, medicine in environmental health, offering scholarly services, policy formulation, consulting, research in international work. While other fields of medicines deal with individual health, preventive medicines deal with community health.

History and objectives 

Preventive and social medicine primarily deal with providing a complete health service in the field of rehabilitation, curative, preventive and promotion in the field of health sector. Preventive and social medicine has been designed at the community level unlike other fields of medicines that are concerned with individuals. This branch of medicine deals with improving the public health.

Responsibilities 

The practice of preventive and social medicine involves managing and assessing surroundings. Their main responsibilities include:
 Offer specialized services for people's health in defined populations.
 Help prevent disease through protection and maintenance of health.
 Assist in preventing disability and premature death.
 Manage and assess health related to environmental or occupational factors.

The field of preventive medicine covers a wide range of medical practices.

Education 

They should have completed MD or a diploma course with specialisation in this field. It is also recommended to have undergone training for practical exposure with community organisation.

There are various universities offering degrees in this field.

See also 

 Preventive healthcare
 Public health

References

Further reading
  766 pages.
 

Public health
Medical humanities